Mark Schulman (born September 4, 1961 in Los Angeles, California) is an American musician and corporate speaker.  He performed with Cher as her tour drummer on her D2K Tour.  Schulman is also a session drummer as well as a music producer, audio engineer and co-owner of West Triad Studios, a recording venue located in Venice, California.

Childhood and education
Schulman was born and raised in Los Angeles, California.  Schulman claims that at age 3, after seeing the Beatles perform on The Ed Sullivan Show, he knew he wanted to be a professional drummer and musician.
  
Born the son of two college English professors, Schulman is a classically trained cellist.  As a teen, he played cello with the Los Angeles Junior Philharmonic. He was also childhood friends with Grammy nominated Guitarist David Becker.

Earlier career
Breaking into the professional music scene, by the mid-1990s, Schulman was the drummer for the band Simple Minds for their album Good News from the Next World and toured with them after the album reached number 2 on the UK Albums Chart. Schulman returned to session work at the end of the tour. Schulman also toured with the band Foreigner in 1993.

Current career
Schulman is currently on tour as a drummer with P!nk's band.  When Schulman is off from touring, Schulman gives drum clinics and gives presentations as a motivational speaker. He is also co-owner, audio engineer, and music producer, at West Triad Studios in Venice, California.  When he first began as tour drummer for P!nk, then-manager Stacey Castro secured his first magazine covers. Schulman continues as P!nk's tour drummer and continues to be sought after by percussion and drummer's magazines in the U.S. and abroad; in 2013, he gave an interview for German magazine, Sticks.

Equipment endorsements
Schulman is an official endorser of various musical instruments including Gretsch drums, Sabian cymbals, Vic Firth drumsticks, Remo drum heads, Toca percussion, and Sennheiser microphones.

References

External links
The official Mark Schulman website
Bio from the official Foreigner website
Vic Firth story on Mark Schulman
Drum Magazine's web site article "In the Studio with Mark Schulman"
Fortune Magazine
Extreme Biz Dev Podcast Ep 20
Iheartradio Podcast- Relaunch
Sticks Magazine Cover August 2013
West Triad (Recording) Studios
Mark Schulman Interview NAMM Oral History Library (2020)

1961 births
Living people
People from Los Angeles
Foreigner (band) members
Musicians from California
20th-century American drummers
American male drummers